The German Book Prize (Deutscher Buchpreis) is awarded annually, in October, by the German Publishers and Booksellers Association (Börsenverein des Deutschen Buchhandels) to the best new German language novel of the year. The books, published in Germany, Austria and Switzerland, are nominated by their publishers, who can propose up to two books from their current or planned publication list. The books should be in shops before the short-list is announced in September of the award year. The winner is awarded €25,000, while the five shortlisted authors receive €2,500 each. It is presented annually during the Frankfurt Book Fair.

The prize was created in 2005, as a successor to the Deutscher Bücherpreis, to heighten awareness for authors writing in German. It is based on the same idea as literary prizes such as the Man Booker Prize or the Prix Goncourt.

Recipients 
2005 
2006 
2007 
2008 
2009 
2010 
2011 
2012 
2013 
2014 
2015 
2016 
2017 
2018 
2019 
2020 
2021 
2022

Notes

External links

 

German literary awards
German-language literary awards
Fiction awards
Awards established in 2005